The , abbreviated to DPP or DPFP, is a centre to centre-right political party in Japan. The party was formed on 7 May 2018 from the merger of the Democratic Party and Kibō no Tō (Party of Hope).

In September 2020, a majority of the party reached an agreement to merge with the Constitutional Democratic Party of Japan and the original party was officially dissolved on 11 September 2020. However, 14 DPP members refused to merge, including party leader Yuichiro Tamaki, and instead formed a new party retaining the DPP name and branding.

History
On 28 September 2017, Democratic Party (DP) leader Seiji Maehara announced that the party had abandoned plans to contest the 2017 general election, with the party's sitting representatives contesting the election as candidates for the Kibō no Tō recently founded by former Tokyo governor Yuriko Koike, or as independents. On 23 October 2017, after the election, Maehara resigned as party president, with the Constitutional Democratic Party of Japan (CDPJ) having replaced the DP as the largest opposition party in the House of Representatives, while the existing DP caucus continued to exist in the House of Councillors.

In January 2018, the DP and the Kibō no Tō agreed to form a joint parliamentary group in both houses of the Diet, although days later the negotiations broke down. On 9 April 2018, it was announced that talks were ongoing to merge the two parties into a new opposition force. On 24 April 2018, at a joint press conference the leadership of the DP and the Kibō no Tō announced that both parties had agreed to merge in May 2018 as the National Democratic Party. The DP and Kibō no Tō on 7 May 2018,  62 members of the predecessor parties joined the DPP at its formation. adopting Democratic Party for the People as their official English language title. DP leader Kōhei Ōtsuka and Kibō leader Yūichirō Tamaki became the interim co-leaders of the new party.

The party held a leadership election in September 2018 to choose a permanent leader. Interim co-leader Tamaki was elected as the permanent leader of the party.

In April 2019, the Liberal Party merged into the Democratic Party for the People.

During the course of the 2022 Japanese House of Councillors election the party was described as "cozying up" to the Liberal Democratic Party (LDP).

Partial merger with CDPJ
On 19 August 2020, the DPP announced that a majority of its members would merge in September of that year with the Constitutional Democratic Party of Japan (CDPJ) and some independent lawmakers. Both parties would officially be dissolved under the agreement. On 10 September 2020, the new party elected Yukio Edano of the CDPJ as its leader and voted to retain the CDPJ party name. The DPP dissolved on 11 September 2020, the day after the leader of the merged party was elected. However, 14 members of the DPP, led by Tamaki, refused to merge with the CDPJ, instead creating a new party which retained the DPP name and branding.

Ideology
A self-proclaimed "reformist centrist" party, it enumerated freedom, symbiosis and responsibility for the future in its basic philosophy and self-proclaimed the establishment of a  based on these philosophies. Otsuka said that the term "Reformist-Centrist Party" describes the attitude and spirit of the DPP that thoroughly adheres to a democratic approach to realistically reform/solve various issues. 

The DPP defines it as "a reform centrist party led by people ranging from moderate-conservatives and liberals". However, unlike the old DPP, the new DPP is considered relatively conservative.

The DPP officially promoted diplomatic pacifism, constitutionalism and sustainable development.

Leadership

Leaders

Election results

House of Representatives

House of Councillors

See also
 Conservative mainstream (in Japanese)
 Minsha kyōkai

References

Notes 

Political parties in Japan
2018 establishments in Japan
Political parties established in 2018
Conservative parties in Japan
Liberal parties in Japan
Centre-right parties in Asia
Centrist parties in Japan